The 1970 Oregon Webfoots football team represented the University of Oregon during the 1970 NCAA University Division football season. Five home games were played in Eugene at Autzen Stadium, with one at Civic Stadium in Portland.

Led by fourth-year head coach Jerry Frei, the Ducks were 6–4–1 overall and 4–3 in the Pacific-8 Conference, tied for second. The opener was played in Portland, the Ducks' first game there in four years; the last was in 1966, prior to the opening of Autzen. After upsetting both UCLA and USC, Oregon was 5–2 and ranked #16 in the AP Poll, but won just one of their last four games.

In the second game of the season at Illinois, senior quarterback (and punter) Tom Blanchard injured a troublesome knee and was relieved by sophomore Dan Fouts, who became the starter. Blanchard returned the next week against third-ranked Stanford, but only as the punter.

The Ducks lost the season-ending Civil War game to Oregon State for a seventh consecutive year.

The marching band was not funded this year; in its place was the student rock band Ouroboros, paid $210 per game.

Schedule

Roster

All-conference

Four Oregon players were named to the All-Pacific-8 team: junior halfback Bobby Moore (later Ahmad Rashad), senior split end Bob Newland, junior linebacker Tom Graham, and senior cornerback Lionel Coleman. On the second team (honorable mention) were senior guard Jack Stambaugh and junior cornerback Bill Drake. Moore also made the first team as a sophomore in 1969 and as a senior in 1971.

References

External links
 WSU Libraries: Game video (color) – Washington State at Oregon – October 3, 1970

Oregon
Oregon Ducks football seasons
Oregon Webfoots football